Lake St Lucia (Lake Saint Lucia) is an estuarine lake system in northern KwaZulu-Natal, South Africa.

The lake was named Santa Lucia by Manuel Perestrello on 13 December 1575, the day of the feast of Saint Lucy. It was later renamed to St. Lucia.

Flora and fauna
More than 2,180 species of flowering plants have been documented in the St Lucia lake system.

St Lucia Lake harbours rich fauna, including crocodiles, hippopotami, monitor lizards, over 400 bird species, invertebrates, and the occasional bull shark.

References

Estuaries of Africa
Landforms of KwaZulu-Natal
St Lucia